Artyom Anatolyevich Sokol (born 30 March 1994) is a Belarusian professional footballer who plays for Surkhon Termez.

Honours
Gomel
Belarusian Cup winner: 2021–22

References

External links 
 
 

1994 births
Living people
Belarusian footballers
Association football defenders
Belarusian expatriate footballers
Expatriate footballers in Uzbekistan
FC Dinamo Minsk players
FC Bereza-2010 players
FC Dnepr Mogilev players
FC Torpedo Minsk players
FC Gomel players
FC Energetik-BGU Minsk players
Surkhon Termez players